Pierre Julien (20 June 1731 – 17 December 1804) was a French sculptor who worked in a full range of rococo and neoclassical styles.

He served an early apprenticeship at Le Puy-en-Velay, near his natal village of Saint-Paulien, then at the École de dessin of Lyon, then entered the Parisian atelier of Guillaume Coustou the Younger. In 1765 he won a Prix de Rome for sculpture with a bas-relief panel of a subject from Antiquity and entered the École royale des élèves protégés, which offered a special course of study under the direction of the painter Louis-Michel van Loo. He was a pensionnaire at the French Academy in Rome,  1768 to 1773, where he was influenced by the tide of neoclassicism that affected his fellow students. As pensionnaires were expected to do, he sent back to France a marble copy from the Antique, slightly reduced in scale, of the so-called Cleopatra, the Vatican's Sleeping Ariadne, which remains at Versailles.

On his return to France and his former master, he worked on the sculpture for the mausoleum of Louis, le Grand Dauphin in the cathedral of Sens. After a failed try in 1776, with his Ganymede, he was received by the Académie royale de peinture et de sculpture in 1778, with a Dying Gladiator for his morceau de réception He was named one of the original members of the Institut de France, 1795, and a chevalier of the Légion d'Honneur, 1804.

He received  commissions from the comte d'Angiviller, director of the Bâtiments du Roi, on behalf of Louis XVI for figures in a suite of life-size portraits of the great men of France: he realized a Jean de La Fontaine and a Nicolas Poussin, whom he elected to represent in his nightclothes, approximating the draperies of a Roman toga. While fulfilling commissions in Paris, for the Church of Sainte-Geneviève (now the Panthéon, Paris), or at the Pavillon de Flore of the Louvre, he sculpted in 1785 a virtuoso marble ensemble of the nymph Amalthea and the goat that nurtured Jupiter for the Queen's fastidiously-appointed Dairy (La Laiterie) at the Château de Rambouillet; for his model, he adapted the pose of the famous Capitoline Venus. Bas-reliefs from the Laiterie, reckoned among his masterpieces, were sold at auction in 1819, but were retrieved by the State in  2005, thanks to a gift from the son of the great dealer-collector Daniel Wildenstein.

Major works
 Gladiateur mourant, marble, 1779, Musée du Louvre.
 Ganymède versant le nectar à Jupiter changé en aigle, marble group, 1776–1778, Paris, musée du Louvre
 Jean de La Fontaine, marble, 1783-85. Musée du Louvre
 Nicolas Poussin, marble, 1789 - 1804. Musée du Louvre
 Nicolas Poussin  terracotta sketch model, about 1787 - 1788. Musée du Louvre
  Amalthée et la chèvre de Jupiter, marble group, 1787 for the Laiterie at Rambouillet. Laiterie de la Reine at Rambouillet
 La Jeune fille à la chèvre, terracotta statuette, 1786. Musée du Louvre
 Sainte Geneviève rendant la vue à sa mère, terracotta bas-relief, 1776. Musée du Louvre

Notes

References
Michael Preston Worley, 2003. Pierre Julien: Sculptor to Queen Marie-Antoinette. The first modern monograph.
Exhibition Catalogue. Gilles Grandjean and Guilhem Scherf. "Pierre Julien 1731-1804". Le Puy-en-Velay, France: Musée Crozatier, 2004.

External links
Europe in the age of enlightenment and revolution, a catalog from The Metropolitan Museum of Art Libraries (fully available online as PDF), which contains material on Julien (see index)
Grove Dictionary of Art on-line excerpts
 

1731 births
1804 deaths
People from Haute-Loire
18th-century French sculptors
French male sculptors
Prix de Rome for sculpture
18th-century French male artists